Série 1960 are a class of diesel-electric locomotives built for Portuguese Railways (CP). They were constructed by Bombardier Transportation and entered service in 1979. Of the 13 built, 5 remain in service in 2012. They have a top speed of 120 km/h and weigh 121 tonnes.

The locomotives were purchased for use on the steeply-graded , with heavily loaded international services from Lisbon to Spain and France, including the "Sud Express". On 11 September 1985, locomotive 1961 was destroyed in an accident near Alcafache whilst operating the Lisbon-Paris international service. Officially, 56 people were listed at being killed in the accident. The Beira Alta line was electrified in 1996 and the Série 1960 locomotives were reassigned to freight duties.

The remaining locomotives are expected to be withdrawn during 2012, with high fuel consumption being a contributing factor.

References

Railway locomotives introduced in 1979
Co′Co′ locomotives
Bombardier Transportation locomotives
5 ft 6 in gauge locomotives
Diesel-electric locomotives of Portugal